In differential geometry and mathematical physics, a spin connection is a connection on a spinor bundle.  It is induced, in a canonical manner, from the affine connection.  It can also be regarded as the gauge field generated by local Lorentz transformations. In some canonical formulations of general relativity, a spin connection is defined on spatial slices and can also be regarded as the gauge field generated by local rotations.

The spin connection occurs in two common forms: the Levi-Civita spin connection, when it is derived from the Levi-Civita connection, and the affine spin connection, when it is obtained from the affine connection. The difference between the two of these is that the Levi-Civita connection is by definition the unique torsion-free connection, whereas the affine connection (and so the affine spin connection) may contain torsion.

Definition

Let  be the local Lorentz frame fields or vierbein (also known as a tetrad), which is a set of orthonormal space time vector fields that diagonalize the metric tensor

Here, Latin letters denote the local Lorentz frame indices; Greek indices denote general coordinate indices. This simply expresses that , when written in terms of the basis , is locally flat. For example,  and 

The torsion-free spin connection is given by

where  are the Christoffel symbols. This definition should be taken as defining the torsion-free spin connection, since, by convention, the Christoffel symbols are derived from the Levi-Civita connection, which is the unique metric compatible, torsion-free connection on a Riemannian Manifold. In general, there is no restriction: the spin connection may also contain torsion.

Note that  using the gravitational covariant derivative  of the contravariant vector .  The spin connection may be written purely in terms of the vierbein field as

which by definition is anti-symmetric in its internal indices .

The spin connection  defines a covariant derivative  on generalized tensors.

Cartan's structure equations
In the Cartan formalism, the spin connection is used to define both torsion and curvature. These are easiest to read by working with differential forms, as this hides some of the profusion of indexes. The equations presented here are effectively a restatement of those that can be found in the article on the connection form and the curvature form. The primary difference is that these retain the indexes on the vierbein, instead of completely hiding them. More narrowly, the Cartan formalism is to be interpreted in its historical setting, as a generalization of the idea of an affine connection to a homogeneous space; it is not yet as general as the idea of a principal connection on a fiber bundle. It serves as a suitable half-way point between the narrower setting in Riemannian geometry and the fully abstract fiber bundle setting, thus emphasizing the similarity to gauge theory. Note that Cartan's structure equations, as expressed here, have a direct analog: the Maurer–Cartan equations for Lie groups (that is, they are the same equations, but in a different setting and notation).

Writing the vierbeins as differential forms

for the orthonormal coordinates on the cotangent bundle, the affine spin connection one-form is 

The torsion 2-form is given by

while the curvature 2-form is

These two equations, taken together are called Cartan's structure equations.
Consistency requires that the Bianchi identities be obeyed. The first Bianchi identity is obtained by taking the exterior derivative of the torsion:

while the second by differentiating the curvature:

The covariant derivative for a generic differential form  of degree p is defined by

Bianchi's second identity then becomes

The difference between a connection with torsion, and the unique torsionless connection is given by the contorsion tensor. Connections with torsion are commonly found in theories of teleparallelism, Einstein–Cartan theory, gauge theory gravity and supergravity.

Derivation

Metricity 
We expect that  will also annihilate the Minkowski metric ,

This implies that the connection is anti-symmetric in its internal indices,   
This is also deduced by taking the gravitational covariant derivative  which implies that  thus ultimately, . This is sometimes called the metricity condition; it is analogous to the more commonly stated metricity condition that  Note that this condition holds only for the Levi-Civita spin connection, and not for the affine spin connection in general.

where antisymmetrization of indices has an implicit factor of 1/2.

By the metric compatibility 

This formula can be derived another way. To directly solve the compatibility condition for the spin connection , one can use the same trick that was used to solve  for the Christoffel symbols . First contract the compatibility condition to give

.

where we have used the definition . The solution for the spin connection is

.

From this we obtain the same formula as before.

Applications

The spin connection arises in the Dirac equation when expressed in the language of curved spacetime, see Dirac equation in curved spacetime. Specifically there are problems coupling gravity to spinor fields: there are no finite-dimensional spinor representations of the general covariance group. However, there are of course spinorial representations of the Lorentz group. This fact is utilized by employing tetrad fields describing a flat tangent space at every point of spacetime. The Dirac matrices  are contracted onto vierbiens,

We wish to construct a generally covariant Dirac equation. Under a flat tangent space Lorentz transformation the spinor transforms as

We have introduced local Lorentz transformations on flat tangent space generated by the 's, such that  is a function of space-time. This means that the partial derivative of a spinor is no longer a genuine tensor. As usual, one introduces a connection field  that allows us to gauge the Lorentz group. The covariant derivative defined with the spin connection is,

and is a genuine tensor and Dirac's equation is rewritten as

The generally covariant fermion action couples fermions to gravity when added to the first order tetradic Palatini action,

The tetradic Palatini formulation of general relativity which is a first order formulation of the Einstein–Hilbert action where the tetrad and the spin connection are the basic independent variables. In the 3+1 version of Palatini formulation, the information about the spatial metric, is encoded in the triad  (three-dimensional, spatial version of the tetrad).

The spatial spin connection appears in the definition of Ashtekar–Barbero variables which allows 3+1 general relativity to be rewritten as a special type of  Yang–Mills gauge theory. One defines . With  as the configuration variable, the conjugate momentum is the densitized triad . With 3+1 general relativity rewritten as a special type of  Yang–Mills gauge theory, it allows the importation of non-perturbative techniques used in Quantum chromodynamics to canonical quantum general relativity.

See also

 Ashtekar variables
 Dirac operator
 Cartan connection
 Levi-Civita connection
 Ricci calculus
 Supergravity
 Torsion tensor
 Contorsion tensor
 Dirac equation in curved spacetime

References

Hehl, F.W.; von der Heyde, P.; Kerlick, G.D.; Nester, J.M. (1976), "General relativity with spin and torsion: Foundations and prospects", Rev. Mod. Phys. 48, 393.
Kibble, T.W.B. (1961), "Lorentz invariance and the gravitational field", J. Math. Phys. 2, 212.
Poplawski, N.J. (2009), "Spacetime and fields", arXiv:0911.0334
Sciama, D.W. (1964), "The physical structure of general relativity", Rev. Mod. Phys. 36, 463.

Connection (mathematics)
Spinors
Differential geometry